Hopea malibato is a species of plant in the family Dipterocarpaceae. It is endemic to the Philippines.

Hopea malibato produces the oligostilbenes malibatol A and B, dibalanocarpol and balanocarpol.

References

malibato
Endemic flora of the Philippines
Trees of the Philippines
Taxonomy articles created by Polbot

Vulnerable flora of Asia